The Digital Rupee (e₹) or eINR or E-Rupee is a tokenised digital version of the Indian Rupee, to be issued by the Reserve Bank of India (RBI) as a central bank digital currency (CBDC). The Digital Rupee was proposed in January 2017 and will be launched in the 2022–23 financial year. Digital Rupee is using blockchain distributed-ledger technology.

Like banknotes it will be uniquely identifiable and regulated by Central Bank. Liability lies with RBI. Plans include online and offline accessibility. RBI will launch Digital Rupee for Wholesale (e₹-W) catering to financial institutions for interbank settlements and Digital Rupee for Retail (e₹-R) for consumer and business transactions. The implementation of the Digital Rupee aims to remove the security printing cost borne by the general public, businesses, banks, and RBI on physical currency which amounted to ₹49,848,000,000.

History 
In 2017
, a high level inter-ministerial committee (IMC) was formed under the Department of Economic Affairs in Ministry of Finance (MoF) on the governance and usage of virtual currencies in India and recommended a digital form of fiat currency using Distributed Ledger Technology (DLT). The Department of Financial Services of MoF, Ministry of Electronics and Information Technology (MeitY) and the Reserve Bank of India (RBI) were invited to form a special group that will look into legal and technological development of CBDC. Without any official recognization to cryptocurrencies, RBI started planning on future CBDC development.

The RBI on 16 December 2020 announced a regulatory sandbox to test next generation technologies on cross border payments to collect field test data and evidence of benefits and risks on the financial ecosystem. On 29 January 2021, the Indian Government proposed a bill to ban trading and investments in cryptocurrencies while giving legal power to RBI for developing CBDC, termed as "programmable digital rupee" using the experience gained from handling Unified Payments Interface (UPI), Immediate Payment Service (IMPS) and Real-time gross settlement (RTGS) for distribution and validation purpose.

As per the Currency and Finance Report of 2021 released by RBI, CBDC backed by the sovereign must promote non-anonymity of monetary transactions and financial inclusion by direct transfers. It must be compliant with national and global money laundering and economic terrorism laws. RBI was planning the initial stage of CBDC trials from December 2021. But now it moved to Q1 2022 before nationwide rollout in phased manner. As per Governor Shaktikanta Das, RBI is still in discussion whether to go with centralized system or use Distributed Ledger Technology. While the preliminary study will be conducted soon, RBI started internal evaluation on scope, legal framework, calibration, technology, distribution and validation mechanism of CBDC citing increase in digital transaction during the COVID-19 pandemic.

The Government of India is working on amendments for The Coinage Act, 2011, Foreign Exchange Management Act (FEMA), 1999, Information Technology Act, 2000 and Crypto-currency and Regulation of Official Digital Currency Bill, 2021 that will govern CBDC in the country.

The Department of Financial Services, Ministry of Health and Family Welfare and National Health Authority introduced e-RUPI on 2 August 2021 which is a prepaid person specific, purpose specific e-voucher based on QR code or SMS string that doesn't require bank account to make it leak proof. It is going to act as a precursor by highlighting the gaps in national digital payment infrastructure that needs further improvement before the nationwide launch of CBDC. At 2022 Union budget of India, Nirmala Sitharaman from the Ministry of Finance announced the roll out of the Digital Rupee starting from 2023. As per the International Monetary Fund, the Digital Rupee can help in currency management and cross border payments in view of high volume of inbound remittance.

Concept stage 
RBI started the process of designing CBDC framework in 2022. Finance Bill 2022 enacted with amendments in Reserve Bank of India Act, 1934 for CBDC. Reserve Bank Innovation Hub (RBIH) will develop proof of concept and run the pilot project before launch. As per Payments Vision 2025 document released by RBI on 17 June 2022, CBDC will be used for domestic and cross border payment processing and settlement. RBI classified CBDC into retail CBDC that will be designed to complete individual financial needs and wholesale CBDC which will be traded between RBI, Public and Private sector banks for currency distribution purpose and economic stability. RBI is also exploring purpose driven CBDC for Direct Benefit Transfer (DBT) to reduce subsidy leakage and corruption.

For internal pilot project, RBI started consultation with FIS, State Bank of India, Punjab National Bank, Union Bank of India and Bank of Baroda. On 5 October 2022 the Fintech Department of RBI released a concept note to create awareness on CBDC and the planned features of upcoming Digital Rupee (e₹). The structure of Digital Rupee will be either token-based or account-based. For a token-based CBDC, it will act closer to physical cash and able to perform retail transactions. Account-based CBDC is for maintaining the balance sheet and is considered for institutional level wholesale transactions. For issuance, RBI is looking at single tier direct model where the central bank keeps control over every aspect of CBDC from account-keeping to transaction verification or a two tier indirect model where RBI issues CBDC to retail banks and financial service providers for wider circulation. RBI is also looking at offline transaction support.

In token-based system, a common public key will be used to initiate the transfer while private key such as user defined password will be used as verification tool to complete the transfer. As per RBI, an e-wallet will be provided for transaction purpose and bank account is not required. While transaction of smaller sums will remain anonymous, larger sums will require self disclosure in compliance with national and global money laundering and economic terrorism laws.

e₹-R will be outside commercial banking system that can help reduce concentration of liquidity and credit risks in payment systems mediated through commercial banks. As per RBI, CBDC will be an additional payment avenue for users and is not meant for replacing existing payment systems. The objective behind CBDC is to support and encourage the growing digital economy, reduce cost of physical cash management, create an efficient monetary payment system and further increase financial inclusion. Digital Rupee is convertible to paper currency without change in value and will show in RBI balance sheet to build trust, safety, liquidity, settlement finality and integrity. To mitigate the risk of introducing a new technology in currency circulation, RBI will design the characteristics of Digital Rupee closer to paper currency and introduce it in a seamless manner. Official launch may happen after 31 March 2023.

Pilot project 
Digital Rupee for Wholesale (e₹-W) was launched on 1 November 2022. It will be used to settle secondary market transaction in government securities. It will help cut transaction cost and preventing the need for settlement guarantee infrastructure or for collateral to mitigate settlement risk. State Bank of India, Bank of Baroda, Union Bank of India, HDFC Bank, ICICI Bank, Kotak Mahindra Bank, Yes Bank, IDFC First Bank and HSBC are participating in the pilot project. Shaktikanta Das on 2 November 2022 revealed that Digital Rupee for Retail (e₹-R) will also start similar trial in the same month. Each participating bank will test e₹-R among 10,000 to 50,000 people. RBI will collaborate with PayNearby and Bankit to integrate CBDC as payment option while National Payments Corporation of India (NPCI) will manage the backend infrastructure.

RBI will also undertake cross border transactions using Digital Rupee during the pilot project. On 1 November 2022, RBI used Digital Rupee to settle Indian government bonds in secondary market transactions worth ₹2.75 billion Indian rupees ($33.29 million). The Phase-1 of pilot project for e₹-R will start from 1 December 2022 in Mumbai, New Delhi, Bengaluru, and Bhubaneswar under State Bank of India, ICICI Bank, Yes Bank, and IDFC First Bank. Ahmedabad, Gangtok, Guwahati, Hyderabad, Indore, Kochi, Lucknow, Patna, and Shimla will be included in Phase-2 under Bank of Baroda, Union Bank of India, HDFC Bank, and Kotak Mahindra Bank. e₹-R will have both P2P and P2M support. A person can pay using QR code. Once e₹-R transferred to individual wallet, small value transactions will not be traced by banks to maintain anonymity. 

In November 2022, e₹-W on average did ₹3,250,000,000 worth of deals per day. For the first two days of e₹-R pilot, ₹30,000,000 worth of digital currencies were created by RBI. Unlike physical currency, there is an option for recovery against loss of e₹. In e₹-R pilot phase, RBI is testing specific use cases for P2P and P2M transaction. RBI is also planning to extend use case of e₹ in cross border transaction at institutional and individual level. As per Minister of State for Finance Pankaj Chaudhary, CBDC in itself will not earn any interest but can be converted into bank deposits. He also clarified that e₹-R is using Blockchain technology. As per RBI, Digital Rupee has reached 50,000 users and 5,000 merchants as of 8 February 2023.

Market acceptance 
Reliance Retail in partnership with Innoviti Technologies ICICI Bank andKotak Mahindra Bank became the first big organised retail chain in the country to accept e₹-R. CCAvenue became the first payment gateway to process e₹-R for online retail transaction.

See also

 Unified Payments Interface
 Central bank digital currency
 Digital renminbi
 eNaira
 E-Cedi
 Petro (cryptocurrency)

References

External links
Reserve Bank of India:
 Issuance of Concept Note on Central Bank Digital Currency
 Payments Vision 2025
 Concept Note on Central Bank Digital Currency
 THE COINAGE ACT, 2011

Ministry of Finance:
 Report of the Committee to propose specific actions to be taken in relation to Virtual Currencies
 Banning of Cryptocurrency & Regulation of Official Digital Currency Bill, 2019
 Report of the Steering Committee on Fintech Related Issues
 THE FINANCE BILL, 2022

Currencies of India
Currencies of the British Empire
Currencies of the Commonwealth of Nations
Central bank digital currencies